The 1967 Sacramento State Hornets football team represented Sacramento State College—now known as California State University, Sacramento—as a member of the Far Western Conference (FWC) during the 1967 NCAA College Division football season. Led by seventh-year head coach Ray Clemons, Sacramento State compiled an overall record of 7–3 with a mark of 4–2 in conference play, placing second in the FWC. The team outscored its opponents 198 to 170 for the season. The Hornets played home games at Charles C. Hughes Stadium and Hornet Stadium in Sacramento, California.

Schedule

References

Sacramento State
Sacramento State Hornets football seasons
Sacramento State Hornets football